The 112th Massachusetts General Court, consisting of the Massachusetts Senate and the Massachusetts House of Representatives, met in 1891 during the governorship of William E. Russell. Henry H. Sprague served as president of the Senate and William Emerson Barrett served as speaker of the House.

Senators

Representatives

See also 
 52nd United States Congress
 List of Massachusetts General Courts

References

Further reading 
 
  (describes 1847–1891)

External links 
 
 

Political history of Massachusetts
Massachusetts legislative sessions
massachusetts
1891 in Massachusetts